The Movement for Unification (LB) is a political party in Kosovo. Its main goal is unification of Kosovo and all other former Yugoslavian territories populated by Albanians to Albania. Its leader is Avni Klinaku, known as co-founder of former National Movement for the Liberation of Kosovo, a nationalist organization of the 1980s promoting active resistance and separation of Kosovo from Yugoslavia, having some  connections to People's Movement of Kosovo (PMK).

Political activity
During 2010 elections in Kosovo, the party ran in coalition with Vetëvendosje, within the latter's parliamentary group, but split the following year.

LB was the promoter of the parliamentary resolute of 6 September 2012 for replacing all telephony codes of Kosovo with +355 of Albania, which was ignored by Kosovo government and overruled by the controversial agreements in Brussels.

On 23 May 2011, Movement for Integration and Unification, joined LB. MIU had been the main successor of National Movement for the Liberation of Kosovo, with  being the leader after the resignation of Smajl Latifi.

Representatives in the Assembly of Kosovo

See also
Albanian nationalism
Kosovo Albanians
Kosovo War
List of Kosovo Albanians
List of political parties in Kosovo
Movement for Integration and Unification
National Movement for the Liberation of Kosovo
People's Movement of Kosovo
Vetëvendosje
Ahtisaari Plan

Notes

References

External links
Official website
Political Platform (in Albanian)
Political Program (in Albanian)

Albanian irredentism
Albanian nationalism in Kosovo
Albanian nationalist parties
Political parties in Kosovo
Political parties with year of disestablishment missing
Political parties with year of establishment missing